The Wrekin transmitting station is a telecommunications and broadcasting facility on The Wrekin, a hill in the county of Shropshire, England. The DTT transmitting arrays add about another 10m to this. It broadcasts digital television, alongside digital and FM (analogue) radio. The station was first proposed in 1966. As The Wrekin is a local beauty spot, many objections had to be overcome and alternative sites analysed before planning consent was given. The transmitter opened in 1975. The building is semi-underground and the tower stands on its roof.

Television
Like the neighbouring Granada transmitter, Winter Hill, The Wrekin serves a large part of North and Mid Wales, despite being the incorrect regional variation. The reason for this was because of the obvious carriage of Channel 5 at the same quality as channels 1-4, and also it carried the English Channel 4 as opposed to the Welsh equivalent, S4C. Since the digital switchover, The Wrekin carries the main six multiplexes (while local relays only carry three) though it has never carried MUXES 7 and 8. Partly because of that nothing altered at all during The Wrekin's 700 MHz clearance in March 2018.

Digital

Before switchover
Unlike analogue television, The Wrekin had a sub-transmission site, also known as The Wrekin B, designed to serve the east of the region, to fill areas in which the main transmitter didn't broadcast into. This was necessary due to co-channel interference issues with Moel-y-Parc, on channels 42, 45 and 49 (see external links). After digital switchover, the frequencies serving the east of the region were removed for compromise frequencies that has better reception in all areas of the region.

† Transmitted from The Wrekin B.

Analogue
Analogue television was switched off during April 2011; BBC2 analogue was switched off on 6 April and the remaining four on 20 April.

Radio
Alongside television, the Wrekin broadcasts a number of local and national radio stations.

Analogue radio

Digital radio

See also
List of towers

References

External links
Entry at the Transmission Gallery
Info and pictures of The Wrekin transmitter (including co-receivable channels)
The Wrekin Transmitter at thebigtower.com

Buildings and structures in Shropshire
Telford and Wrekin
Transmitter sites in England